DWDE-TV, channel 35, is a low-powered UHF television station in the Philippines owned and operated by the Delta Broadcasting System, a company owned by El Shaddai servant leader Bro. Mike Z. Velarde. Its studios and transmitter are located at 8F Queensway Building, 118 Amorsolo St. Legaspi Village, Makati.

History
Fourteen years after DWXI-AM 1314 was launched, El Shaddai leader Bro. Mike Z. Velarde launched a TV station that was put on VHF Channel 11 (from MBC, the original owners of the frequency allocation; now currently of A2Z is a blocktime agreement of ABS-CBN Corporation is now-recalled channel frequency of the former). It shows religious TV Shows, including El Shaddai. In 1998, ZOE Broadcasting Network through its head Jesus is Lord leader Eddie Villanueva bought Channel 11 and DBS TV moved to Channel 35. Around 2004, it ceased broadcasting due to poor ratings & lack of funds. Despite this, El Shaddai appointments & events are still heard over DWXI-AM.

On September 15, 2012, during the Weekly Family Appointment with El Shaddai at Amvel City, Velarde announced to the audience and to its listeners and viewers that DBS granted its TV equipment for DBS TV's comeback as early as possible. On July 14, 2016, DBS TV-35 resumed its operations as a test broadcast, operating on a weak signal and can be picked up by some Cavite, Laguna, Batangas and southern Metro Manila viewers by airing the previous Family Appointment with El Shaddai. On December 4, 2016, during the 28th Anniversary of El Shaddai DWXI PPFI Hong Kong Chapter, Velarde announced the station will officially return to air but the plan was shelved due to the lack of facilities in its station's studios and transmitter.

On April 30, 2019, Velarde announced that this channel will be operating in full digital terrestrial television following the Philippine Congress' granting of the DBS franchise to maintain and operate broadcast stations in the Philippines signed by President Rodrigo Duterte. Currently, the station remains inactive.

See also
 DWXI-AM
 Delta Broadcasting System
 El Shaddai (movement)
 Mike Velarde

References

Television stations in Metro Manila
Television channels and stations established in 1995
Television channels and stations disestablished in 2004
Defunct television stations in the Philippines